Classification 7–12 of the MŽRKL basketball competition took place between 27 January and 10 February 2016.

Seventh place game

Game 1

Game 2

Ninth place game

Game 1

Game 2

Notes
 Partizan which was supposed to play in the MŽRKL in the group B withdrew from the competition and the last placed team in Group A will automatically take 11 place.

External links
Official website
MŽRKL 2015–16 Classification 7–12 at srbijasport.net

Classification 7-12
2015–16 in Bosnia and Herzegovina basketball
2015–16 in Croatian basketball
2015–16 in Slovenian basketball